Lagny is the name or part of the name of three communes of France:
Lagny, Oise in the Oise département
Lagny-le-Sec in the Oise département
Lagny-sur-Marne in the Seine-et-Marne département